Subject to Change is the first and only EP by American hardcore band The Faith. It was released in December 1983 through Dischord Records. Like other influential D.C. records, it was released after the band had broken up. For the band's only other release after their split LP with Void, Edward Janney added some second guitar.

Overview

AllMusic described it to be "hot-wired classic hardcore outrage and self-questioning, as before" giving it 4 stars out of 5; and also praised the production.
Don Zientara once again handled the recording, with Ivor Hanson's drumming sounding both stronger and also a touch more accomplished. Bass and guitar seemed to have switched positions of prominence in the mix, with Mike Hampton's crunch a touch more subtle and Chris Bald's own crisp work more directly audible.

It makes for a calm but interesting contrast; in combination with the fine if not especially original songs, the result is more prime hardcore. Alec MacKaye still screams with passion but also has a little more open ache slipping through here and there, which goes well with the lyrics of songs like "Limitations" and the combination of reflection and call to action in the especially inspiring title track. It all makes for a fine way for this solid band to be remembered.

As the record progresses things get even more dynamic. "Say No More" finds Alec near-singing, and ends with four hand claps. Also, rather than snarling that he wants to make society bleed, he drops lines like "It's a feeling coming from your heart. Don't want to stop it, just want to know how it starts." If listened closely enough on "Aware" and "More of the Same," something can even be noticed, something more or less alien to hardcore records of the era: guitar solos.

As an exceptional record, not only because of its heavy, melodious (but not poppy, in fact punk) sound, but because of its great personal, introspective lyrics, things one can really relate to; it is far from a transitional record; the eight songs on Subject to Change are totally complete and powerful. The scene, however, was about to raze itself and start again from scratch. The record, in its music, lyrics, and especially the title song, was a forecast of the great things to come.

Influence
When The Faith released it in 1983, the record marked a critical evolution in the sound of D.C. hardcore and punk music in general. Alec MacKaye's voice is still as bitterly venomous as ever on the lead track "Aware," but the new dual guitar version of The Faith was a far cry musically from the tracks on the Void split.

The record (along with the previous year's LPs by Scream and Marginal Man) did not only pave the way for bands like Dag Nasty, Rites of Spring, obviously Embrace (which is the same band except for an exchange of MacKaye brothers and the absence of Eddie Janney) and Fugazi who would continue to combine desperate introspective lyrics with angry, melody-tinged songwriting that moved even further from the hardcore formula, but also a subsequent generation of bands such as Nirvana and Sonic Youth. Subject to Change deserves to be thought of as one of the first melodic hardcore records, as significant to the form as Bad Religion or the Descendents; the whole scene would sound markedly different without this precursor. The Faith strove for fewer personally destructive and more thoughtful and introspective lyrics, and it is little surprise that the band went in the direction they did after their split. Their last release began to push the boundaries of early post-hardcore.

Track listing

Notes
Demos recorded in December 1981 at Inner Ear Studios.
The 2011 reissue does not the include the looped laugh after "Slowdown".

Personnel

The Faith
Chris Bald – bass
Ivor Hanson – drums
Michael Hampton – guitars
Eddie Janney – guitars
Alec MacKaye – vocals

Production
Ian MacKaye, The Faith – production
Don Zientara – engineering
Kim Gregg – photography [front cover]
Tiffany Pruitt – photography [back cover]
Amy Pickering, Leslie Clague, Susan Dynner – photography [insert]
Glen E. Friedman – photography [label]

References

External links
Dischord Records, Subject to Change

1983 EPs
Hardcore punk EPs
The Faith (American band) albums